The Ho Chi Minh City University of Technology (abbreviation: HCMUT  ) is a member of Vietnam National University, Ho Chi Minh City and a leading university in technology training and research activities in Vietnam.

HCMUT specializes in technology, industry, and management. It constitutes 11 faculties, 14 research and development (R&D) centres, 4 training centres, 10 offices, and one joint stock company as of May 2005. 60,000 engineers and bachelors have graduated from HCMUT in the past 40 years since Vietnam's unification. Today, HCMUT has trained more than 60,000 engineers, bachelors, masters, and 200 doctors from all over the globe.

History
As a result of the decree 213/GD signed by President Ngô Đình Diệm on 29 Jun 1957, the university was known as the National Center of Technology (also known as Phu Tho National Center of Technology). The centre included four partner colleges: College of Civil Engineering, College of Electrical Engineering, College of Industrial Arts Engineering (École Supérieure d'Ingénieurs des Arts Industriels - Kỹ sư Công nghệ) and Vietnam National Maritime Engineering.

It was in the 1960s that the College of Chemistry was established, which is part of the National Center of Technology.

In 1972, the National Center of Technology has been renamed the National Institute of Technology, which was the only centre in South Vietnam to train technical engineers and subject matter experts. According to decree 010/SL/VNGDTN signed on 11 January 1974, the National Institute of Technology was merged into the Thu Duc Institute of Technology and renamed the University of Technology. Thanh Hoa Postgraduate Department (the current Environmental Engineering Faculty) was established in the same year. This was the first time when the university conducted its post-graduate training programme. After the national reunification, the university was renamed the Ho Chi Minh University of Technology as Saigon was renamed to Ho Chi Minh City (according to Decision 426/TTg signed by the President of the Cabinet on 27 October 1976). Being one of the three largest universities of technology in Vietnam, the Ho Chi Minh University of Technology has the mission of training engineers majoring in the fields of capital construction, industry, resources exploration and exploitation, and environmental preservation to provide a force of manpower mainly for the southern areas of Vietnam.

As of 1981, HCMUT has expanded its scope to include postgraduate training as well. It was in 1990 that HCMUT opened its master's degree training system for students. Since 1981, the postgraduate training in HCMUT has been geared towards a specialised group of students.

According to decision 16/CP by the Prime Minister on 17 January 1995, the Vietnam National University, Ho Chi Minh City (VNU-HCM) was founded. The Ho Chi Minh University of Technology became one of the 9 members of VNU-HCM and was renamed the University of Engineering.

According to decision 15/2001/QĐ-TTg and decision 16/2001/QĐ-TTg by The Prime Minister on 2 December 2001, the Vietnam National University, Ho Chi Minh City was reorganised with only 3 members; and the University of Engineering gained back its traditional name as Ho Chi Minh University of Technology.

Infrastructure
There are 2 campuses: one is located within the center area of Ho Chi Minh City and the other in the outskirts of the municipality. The former campus one, 14 hectares, has the address of 268 Lý Thường Kiệt St, District 10,  Ho Chi Minh City. The campus has 117 classrooms (14,479 m2), 96 laboratories (12,197 m2), 3 workshops (6,950 m2), and 1 library (1,145 m2 – for both undergraduate and graduate student). The latter one, 26 ha of area, is located in Linh Trung Ward, Thủ Đức, Ho Chi Minh City. The campus has 3 buildings which consist of 54 classrooms and halls, 26 laboratories, and a covered stadium. Furthermore, HCMUT also has an inner city 1.4 ha dormitory. With expenditures of 101 billion VND, the dormitory was rebuilt in 2004 and was put into operation in 2009.

The event between 2001 and 2005 is that, with the self-funded budget (from tuition fees, science research, and technology transfer and other training activities), HCMUT focused on rebuilding an area of 26,128 m2 (40% rise compared to that of 1995), upgrading classrooms, laboratories, library, of which total area is 7,670 m2 (increases 50% in comparison to that of 1995), invested in equipment for training activities. All classrooms are equipped with projectors, computers, and laboratories with modern tools for training and science research (worth 80 billion VND).

At HCMUT, a number of teaching and learning materials in various fields are available almost all of the time. Among them, 55% (509 magazines) are written by HCMUT professors. There are 277 magazines (191 of them are in foreign languages and the rest is in Vietnamese), 9,460 magazines with more than 36,555 books, 30 computers for internet access, and other types of materials such as scientific magazines in the library. The library is invested with an annual budget of more than 1 billion VND in maintenance, and learning materials, including printing curriculum for educational purposes.

Academics
To fulfill the demands for the workforce related to industrial and technological majors in Vietnam, the university completed the outcome and thorough academic programmes for 34 undergraduate majors and 1 major in college programme following the ABET standards, but HCMUT has not been yet accredited. Although most students are recommended to follow the planned studying schedules since they are already compressed, they can either add or take out the number of credits they take up to a fixed specific amount determined by the university each semester.

Academic programmes
Programmes span one semester which is from early August to mid-May. They are classified into seven :
 Formal and informal undergraduate education
 Postgraduate education
 College Programme: Although the name of the programme may make sense at first, it is simply similar to community college in the U.S. higher education system. The naming convention in Vietnam is slightly different from the U.S. or others.
 Education programme for the gifted and talented: While studying at HCMUT, professors will recommend prominent and prospective students to this class, usually at the end of the sophomore year.
 PFIEV (Programme de Formation d'Ingénieurs d'Excellence au Vietnam) Programme: HCMUT has cooperated with France on this training programme. Students when entering HCMUT can choose to follow this type of programme whose courses are mostly taught in French. Ones with strong academic progress will be offered certifications recognised by the Engineers Association of France to be able to practice in Europe.
 Advanced Programme: This is a national project that enables HCMUT to implement the training organisation system of the Electrical and Electronics Sector, Department of Electrical and Engineering, the University of Illinois Urbana-Champaign, US. This programme is highly focused on Electrical and Electronic Engineering.
 Articulation Programme: This programme offers students involved in two years to study at HCMUT and the rest of the academic programmes at partner universities and institutions in others countries.
 English Programme: HCMUT offers undergraduate study programmes in management, and engineering that are completely taught in English.
 Executive MBA-MCI Programme: This MBA programme is conducted by HCMUT in partnership with the University of Applied Science and Arts Northwestern Switzerland. The programme is specialised in Management Consulting International, which is certified by FIBAA - Foundation for International Business Administration Accreditation.

Faculties

A total of 33 Bachelor's Degrees, 41 Master's Degrees, and 41 Doctorate Degrees are conferred in 11 faculties.

Office for International Study Programmes
Office for International Study Programme (Abbreviation: OISP) serves as the center managing all international study programmes of HCMUT such as the Advanced Programme, English Programmes, Articulation Programmes for both undergraduates and postgraduates and the Executive MBA-MCI Programme.

History
In 1990, HCMUT gained its first international partnership in education and research. In 2006, OISP is established to unify and professionalise the process of managing HCMUT's international study programmes.

Study Programs
 Advanced Programme: Electrical - Electronic Engineering
 English Programmes: Industrial Management; Environmental Management and Technology; Chemical Engineering; Petroleum Engineering; Mechanical Engineering; Automotive Engineering; Logistics; Aerospace Engineering; Computer Engineering; Computer Science
 Articulation Programmes: Business Administration; Chemical Engineering; Pharmaceutical Engineering; Petroleum Engineering; Civil Engineering; Information Technology; Electrical - Electronic Engineering; Mechatronic Engineering
 Executive MBA-MCI Programme: specialised in Management Consulting International

Partner universities
Australia:
 University of Adelaide
 University of Queensland
 Griffith University
 La Trobe University
 University of Technology Sydney

Japan:
 Kanazawa University
 Nagaoka University of Technology

United States:
 University of Illinois Urbana-Champaign
 University of Illinois Springfield
 Catholic University of America
 Rutgers University
 University of Massachusetts Boston

Extra-curricular activities
 The voluntary “Green Summer Campaign” is one of the biggest annual activities of the school. Students participating in the campaign will commute to remote areas to improve literacy rates and help the local residents build the infrastructure of their regions.
 Freshman students will have excursions to Cu Chi Tunnel to learn about the historic land.
 There are clubs for students to join such as English Club, French Club for students with an interest in foreign languages; Hiphop Club; Robot Club for those who share huge passions in creating and utilising robots and exchanging experiences to prepare for the annual Robocon (National Robot Contests)...

Athletics
As there are many courts and fields on HCMUT campuses, students can always take part in an abundance of sports activities such as basketball, volleyball, football, tennis, etc.
Occasionally, students of HCMUT can either take part in sports competitions among the Faculties of the school or among institutions in Ho Chi Minh City.

Achievements
Students of HCMUT have won 208 Olympic prizes in the fields of Mathematics, Physics, Informatics, Mechanics, Civil, and Architecture Engineering ten years after their first participation. Among those prizes, there are 10 First prizes, 29 Second prizes, and 72 Third prizes.

In the 2014 National Olympic Contest in Mechanics, HCMUT became the leading institution with prizes awarded to 5 winning teams and 49 individuals. In 2015, HCMUT continues to assert its leading position in this national competition with more prizes awarded to 8 winning teams and 60 individuals. In particular, the winning teams won 1 First prize, 2 Second prizes, and 5 Third prizes. Among those 60 individual prizes, there are 1 First prize, 14 Second prizes, 21 Third prizes, and 24 Consolation prizes.

The students have also brought back the Championship of Asia-Pacific Mini Robots Contest in 2002 (held in Japan), 2004 (South Korea), and 2006 (Malaysia).

With a total amount of 314 million VND, the school has sponsored two high schools of Thanh Hóa, Long An Province and Khanh Thuong-Khanh Vinh City, Khánh Hòa Province. 225 million was used by the labour union of HCMUT to build houses of gratitude and 118.6 million VND was used for building houses for unfortunate people over the past 10 years. 253 million VND is spent on gifts offered to orphanages, charity schools, disabled children, and children who suffer from dioxin.

International partnership and Research collaboration
The University of Illinois Urbana-Champaign and the Ho Chi Minh University of Technology have established a partnership to share the academic curriculum and create an exchange programme. Some of HCMUT's brightest undergraduate and master's students will do their PhD research at Illinois.

The Norwegian group Roxar AS has established a partnership with HCMUT. Roxar will assist the university in building a high-tech lab. The group hopes that some students will choose to work for it after they graduate.

International research collaborations:
 University of Applied Sciences Mannheim, Germany
 Protestant University for Applied Sciences Freiburg, Germany
 Johannes Kepler University Linz, Austria
 University of Leeds, UK
 Kryvyi Rih National University, Ukraine
 Waseda University, Japan
 Hokkaido University, Japan
 Japan Advanced Institute of Science and Technology, Japan
 National University of Singapore and Nanyang Technological University, Singapore
 Annual International Workshop on Advanced Computing and Applications (ACOMP)
 Pacific Rim Applications and Grid Middleware Assembly (PRAGMA)

Notable alumni
 Trương Hòa Bình - Former Deputy Prime Minister of Vietnam, Former Chief Justice of the Supreme People's Court of Vietnam
 Prof. Ph.D. Nguyễn Thiện Nhân - Secretary of the Ho Chi Minh City Party Committee, Former Chair of the Central Committee of the Vietnamese Fatherland Front, Former Deputy Prime Minister of Vietnam, Former Minister of Education and Training, Former Vice President of HCMUT
 Trần Lưu Quang - Standing Deputy Secretary of HCMC Party Committee
 Nguyễn Thị Thu Hà - Vice Chairman of Ho Chi Minh City People's Committee
 Ph.D. Nguyễn Thanh Mỹ - Inventor, Businessman, Chairman of American Dye Source, Inc., Chairman of Mỹ Lan Corporation
 Huỳnh Hữu Bằng, Managing Director of SBT Corporation
 Prof. Dr. Phan Thanh Binh, Chairman of the Committee for Culture, Education, Youth and Children, Vietnam National Assembly, Former President of Vietnam National University, Ho Chi Minh City
 Trần Bá Dương - Founder and Chairman of Truong Hai Auto Corporation (THACO)
 Trần Quí Thanh - Chairman & CEO of Tan Hiep Phat Beverage Group

See also
 List of universities in Vietnam
 Vietnam National University, Ho Chi Minh City

References

External links
Official website
International Relations

Universities in Ho Chi Minh City
Technical universities and colleges in Vietnam
Engineering universities and colleges in Vietnam